Kala (Mandarin:东朗乡) is a township in Muli Tibetan Autonomous County, Liangshan Yi Autonomous Prefecture, Sichuan, China. In 2010, Donglang Township had a total population of 2,591: 1,279 males and 1,312 females: 653 aged under 14, 1,750 aged between 15 and 65 and 188 aged over 65.

See also 
 List of township-level divisions of Sichuan

References 

Township-level divisions of Sichuan
Liangshan Yi Autonomous Prefecture